The L Legislature of the Mexican Congress of Union met from 1976 to 1979. It consisted of senators and deputies who were members of their respective chambers. They began their duties on September 1, 1976 and ended on August 31, 1979.

The senators and deputies were elected to office in the 1976 elections. The senators were elected for a period of six years (so they maintained their seat in the next legislature), and the deputies were elected for a period of three years.

Members
The make up of the L Legislature was as follows:

Senate of the Republic

The members of the Mexican Senate were elected two from each state and the Federal District, giving a total of 64 senators. For the first time in history a senator was elected who did not belong to the Institutional Revolutionary Party (PRI). Jorge Cruickshank García had been nominated by the PPS, however the PRI did not lose this seat, because it formed an electoral alliance with the winning party. Thus this senator posed no opposition to the PRI or the government during his term.

Number of Senators by political party

The 64 Senators forming the L Legislature are the following:

Senators by state

Chamber of Deputies
In the L Legislature, the Chamber of Deputies was composed of a total of 238 deputies, of which 196 were elected by majority vote in each constituency and 41 more were deputies by party. These were allocated in proportion to the votes that the non-winning parties obtained in the districts.

The composition of the House of Representatives in the L Legislature was as follows:

Number of Deputies by political party

Deputies from single-member districts (plurality)

Deputies by party

Presidents of the high commission of the Camara of Deputies 
 (1976 - 1977): Augusto Gómez Villanueva 
 (1977 - 1979): Rodolfo González Guevara 
 (1979): Antonio Riva Palacio López

Main accomplishments
It was the L Legislature that, in 1977, adopted the first political reforms to occur in Mexico. This reform, negotiated by Secretary of the Interior Jesús Reyes Heroles, included legal recognition of political organizations from the left, traditionally marginalized and pushed into armed struggle, especially after the events of 1968 and which degenerated into a dirty war during the 1970s.

Legal reform, known formally as the Ley de Organizaciones Políticas y Procedimientos Electorales (LOPPE) (Law of Political Organizations and Electoral Procedures), defined and made possible procedures for the registration of new political parties (in 1977 legally there were only the PRI, the National Action Party) (PAN), the Popular Socialist Party (PPS) and the Authentic Party of the Mexican Revolution (PARM)). This allowed for the registration, for the first time in 40 years of the Mexican Communist Party, which was followed by the National Assembly of the Socialist Left, the Mexican Democratic Party and the Social Democratic Party.

In addition, the (LOPPE) increased the size of the Chamber of Deputies, increasing the number of electoral districts from 196 to 300, and establishing deputies by proportional representation, replacing the previous deputies by party. There would be 100 such positions, resulting in the Chamber of Deputies, being composed of 400 deputies.

See also
 Congress of the Union
 Mexico Chamber of Deputies
 Senate of the Republic (Mexico)

Notes

References

External links
 Official page of the Chamber of Deputies
 Official page of the senate

Congress of Mexico by session
1976 in Mexico
1977 in Mexico
1978 in Mexico
1979 in Mexico
1976 in politics
1977 in politics
1978 in politics
1979 in politics